Special Vehicle Team, also known as SVT, was an arm of Ford Motor Company responsible for the development of the company's highest-performance vehicles. Established in 1991, SVT was the successor to the SVO division. The last SVT Director was Hermann Salenbauch. SVT was previously led by Hau Thai-Tang (2004–2007) and John Coletti (1993-2004). In 2015, Ford Racing, alongside Ford Team RS and Special Vehicle Team, merged into a global entity named Ford Performance.

Information
The group mainly produces specially tuned versions of Ford production vehicles such as the 2010 F-150 SVT Raptor which is based on the Ford F150. However, they do occasionally develop models independently of the rest of the company, namely the GT supercar (developed in conjunction with Saleen).  SVT was founded in 1983 by John Plant of Ford Marketing, Janine Bay of Ford Mustang Program Management, and Robert Burnham of Ford Truck Program Management.  Originally known as Special Vehicle Operations, SVO developed the 1984–1986 2.3-liter turbo-charged 4-cylinder Mustang SVO, as well as marketed performance parts through dealer networks (now known as Ford Performance Parts, or FPP).

Ford SVT debuted the 2010 F-150 SVT Raptor high-performance off-road truck. Using a completely re-designed suspension, with internal-bypass Fox Racing Shocks and specially developed BF Goodrich all-terrain 35" tires, the Raptor is considered an OEM-style "pre-runner." Pre-runners are reconnaissance vehicles used for high-speed testing of off-road race courses before a race. 

F-150 SVT Raptor also debuted the all-new 6.2-liter V8 engine as an option for the 2010 model year (likely to be standard in subsequent model years). Ford reports horsepower and torque as 411 hp (306 kW) @ 5500 rpm, 434 lb·ft (588 N·m) @ 4500 rpm in the Raptor. All Raptor models will have a 6-speed automatic transmission, selectable 4WD, and rear E-Locker that stays engaged at high-speeds. 

In 2015 as a result of Ford's plan to globalize their vehicles, SVT and the European RS division merged, forming Ford Performance and thus aligning all American and European performance vehicle activity together.

SVT vehicles

SVT is credited in the following vehicles:
 1993 SVT Cobra
 1993 SVT Cobra R
 1993-1995 Ford SVT Lightning
 1994-1995 SVT Cobra
 1995 SVT Cobra R
 1995 Ford GT90
 1996-1998 SVT Cobra
 1998-2000 SVT Contour
 1999-2001 SVT Cobra
 2000 SVT Cobra R
 1999-2004 Ford SVT Lightning
 2003-2004 SVT Cobra
 2002-2004 SVT Focus
 2005–2006 Ford GT
 2010–2014 Ford F-150 SVT Raptor, (the 2017-present Raptor loses the SVT prefix)
 2007-2014 SVT/Shelby GT500
 2000  Ford SVT Thunder, (this car is based on the 2000 Ford Expedition)

See also
 Ford TeamRS, Ford's European performance car and motorsport division
 Ford Performance Vehicles (FPV), Ford Australia's performance car division

References

External links
 Ford SVT on Ford Performance
 Official Ford SVT collector cars

Ford Motor Company
Official motorsports and performance division of automakers